Pimelea punicea is a species of flowering plant in the family Thymelaeaceae and is endemic to northern Australia. It is an annual herb with narrowly egg-shaped to lance-shaped leaves arranged in opposite pairs, and clusters of red or orange-red flowers with 4 green, egg-shaped involucral bracts.

Description
The flowers are red to orange-red and arranged in heads on the ends of branches on a peduncle expanded at its top into a funnel-shaped receptacle. Flowering mainly occurs from February to July.

Taxonomy
Pimelea punicea was first formally described in 1810 by Robert Brown in his Prodromus Florae Novae Hollandiae et Insulae Van Diemen. The specific epithet (punica) means "crimson".

Distribution and habitat
This pimelea mainly grows in open forest, usually in sandy soil and often in rocky ground. It is found from near the Fitzroy River in Western Australia to the western edge of the Gulf of Carpentaria in the north of the Northern Territory.

Conservation status
Pimelea punicea is listed as "not threatened" by the Western Australian Government Department of Biodiversity, Conservation and Attractions and as of "least concern" under the Territory Parks and wildlife Conservation Act.

References

punicea
Malvales of Australia
Flora of Western Australia
Flora of the Northern Territory
Plants described in 1810
Taxa named by Robert Brown (botanist, born 1773)